Ahmed Jamal may refer to:

 Ahmad Jamal (born 1930), American jazz pianist, composer, bandleader, and educator
 Ahmed Jamal (cricketer) (born 1988), Pakistani cricketer
 Ahmed Jamal (footballer) (born 2000), Egyptian footballer